De Roux or DeRoux is the surname of:

 Dominique de Roux (1935–1977), French writer and publisher
 François de Roux (1897–1954), French writer
 Marie Manning (murderer) (née de Roux) (1821–1849), Swiss domestic servant and murderess
 Monique de Roux (born 1946), French painter and engraver
 Paul Le Roux (born 1972), Rhodesian programmer, criminal cartel boss and informant
 Pierre-Guillaume de Roux (1963–2021), French editor
 Stefanie de Roux, Panamanian model and beauty pageant contestant
 Stephen DeRoux (born 1983), Jamaican footballer
 Xavier de Roux (1940–2015), French politician

See also
 Roux (disambiguation), which includes a list of people with the surname
 Leroux (surname)

Surnames of French origin